Connor Hawke is a fictional DC Comics superhero.

Connor Hawke may also refer to:

 Connor Hawke (Arrowverse Earth-1), the version of the character from Arrow
 Connor Hawke (Arrowverse Earth-16), the version of the character from Legends of Tomorrow